Srabon or Shaon  ( Srabôn, শাওন Shaon) is the fourth month of the Bengali calendar and one of the two months that make up the wet season, locally called "Barsha" ( Bôrsha). Artisans start making idols for Durga Puja, Kali Puja, etc. in this month.

Etymology 
It is named after the star Shrobona ( Shrôbôna).

Events 
 10 Srabon – 187 were killed on Sohagpur massacre in 1971.
 22 Srabon – Poet Rabindranath Tagore in 1348.

References

Months of the Bengali calendar